The express train locomotives of Oldenburg Class S 10 were built for the Grand Duchy of Oldenburg State Railways for duties on the Bremen–Oldenburg–Wilhelmshaven line, which was the most important express route in Oldenburg. They were amongst the few locomotives of this railway company that were not based on those of the Prussian state railways, because the light railway track dictated that they had to have an average axle load of no more than 15 t which was lower than that on comparable Prussian vehicles.

The three vehicles of this class were built by Hanomag from 1917 and had a 2-6-2 (Prairie) wheel arrangement which was rare for Germany. They had Lentz valve gear which was typical of Oldenburg. The engines had an uneven distribution of load, however, as well as poor riding qualities and were often bedevilled with boiler problems. In addition, an incorrect matching of the radiative and tube heating areas led to leaks in sides of the tubes.

The three S 10 engines were grouped by the Deutsche Reichsbahn into Class 16 with operating numbers 16 001–16 003. They were the only express train locomotives with a 2-6-2 wheel arrangement and therefore had their own class. After the lines were upgraded to 17 tonnes axle load, the temperamental S 10s were retired by 1926 and replaced by Prussian P 8s that had been employed in Oldenburg since 1921.

The locomotives were coupled with Oldenburg class 2'2' T 20 tenders.

See also 
Grand Duchy of Oldenburg State Railways
List of Oldenburg locomotives and railbuses
Länderbahnen

References 

 
 

2-6-2 locomotives
S 10
Railway locomotives introduced in 1917
Hanomag locomotives
Standard gauge locomotives of Germany
1′C1′ h2 locomotives
Passenger locomotives